Juan Evo Morales Ayma  (born 26 October 1959) is a Bolivian politician, trade union organizer, and former cocalero activist who served as the 65th president of Bolivia from 2006 to 2019. Widely regarded as the country's first president to come from its indigenous population, his administration focused on the implementation of left-wing policies, improving the legal rights and socioeconomic conditions of Bolivia's previously-marginalized indigenous population and combating the political influence of the United States and resource-extracting multinational corporations. Ideologically a socialist, he has led the Movement for Socialism (MAS) party since 1998.

Born to an Aymara family of subsistence farmers in Isallawi, Orinoca Canton, Morales undertook a basic education and mandatory military service before moving to the Chapare Province in 1978. Growing coca and becoming a trade unionist, he rose to prominence in the campesino ("rural laborers") union. In that capacity, he campaigned against joint U.S.–Bolivian attempts to eradicate coca as part of the War on Drugs, denouncing these as an imperialist violation of indigenous Andean culture. His involvement in anti-government direct action protests resulted in multiple arrests. Morales entered electoral politics in 1995, was elected to Congress in 1997, and became leader of MAS in 1998. Coupled with populist rhetoric, he campaigned on issues affecting indigenous and poor communities, advocating land reform and more equal redistribution of money from Bolivian gas extraction. He gained increased visibility through the Cochabamba Water War and gas conflict. In 2002, he was expelled from Congress for encouraging anti-government protesters, although he came second in that year's presidential election.

Once elected president in 2005, Morales increased taxation on the hydrocarbon industry to bolster social spending and emphasized projects to combat illiteracy, poverty, and racial and gender discrimination. Vocally criticizing neoliberalism, Morales' government moved Bolivia towards a mixed economy, reduced its dependence on the World Bank and International Monetary Fund (IMF), and oversaw strong economic growth. Scaling back United States influence in the country, he built relationships with leftist governments in the Latin American pink tide, especially Hugo Chávez's Venezuela and Fidel Castro's Cuba, and signed Bolivia into the Bolivarian Alliance for the Americas. His administration opposed the autonomist demands of Bolivia's eastern provinces, won a 2008 recall referendum, and instituted a new constitution that established Bolivia as a plurinational state. Re-elected in 2009 and 2014, he oversaw Bolivia's admission to the Bank of the South and Community of Latin American and Caribbean States, although his popularity was dented by attempts to abolish presidential term limits. Following the disputed 2019 election and the ensuing unrest, Morales agreed to calls for his resignation. After this temporary exile, he returned following the election of President Luis Arce.

Morales' supporters laud him as a champion of indigenous rights, anti-imperialism, and environmentalism, and he was credited with overseeing significant economic growth and poverty reduction as well as increased investment in schools, hospitals, and infrastructure. Critics point to democratic backsliding during his tenure, argue that his policies sometimes failed to reflect his environmentalist and indigenous rights rhetoric, and that his defense of coca contributed to illegal cocaine production.

Early life and activism

Childhood, education, and military service: 1959–1978 
Morales was born in the small rural village of Isallawi in Orinoca Canton, part of western Bolivia's Oruro Department, on 26 October 1959, to an Aymara family. One of seven children born to Dionisio Morales Choque and his wife María Ayma Mamani, only he and two siblings, Esther and Hugo, survived past childhood. His mother almost died from a postpartum haemorrhage following his birth. In keeping with Aymara custom, his father buried the placenta produced after his birth in a place specially chosen for the occasion. His childhood home was a traditional adobe house, and he grew up speaking the Aymara language, although later commentators would remark that by the time he had become president he was no longer an entirely fluent speaker.

Morales' family were farmers; from an early age, he helped them to plant and harvest crops and guard their herd of llamas and sheep, taking a homemade soccer ball to amuse himself. As a toddler, he briefly attended Orinoca's preparatory school, and at five began schooling at the single-room primary school in Isallawi. Aged 6, he spent six months in northern Argentina with his sister and father. There, Dionisio harvested sugar cane while Evo sold ice cream and briefly attended a Spanish-language school. As a child, he regularly traveled on foot to Arani province in Cochabamba with his father and their llamas, a journey lasting up to two weeks, in order to exchange salt and potatoes for maize and coca. A big fan of soccer, at age 13 he organized a community soccer team with himself as team captain. Within two years, he was elected training coach for the whole region, and thus gained early experience in leadership.

After finishing primary education, Morales attended the Agrarian Humanistic Technical Institute of Orinoca (ITAHO), completing all but the final year. His parents then sent him to study for a degree in Oruro; although he did poorly academically, he finished all of his courses and exams by 1977, earning money on the side as a brick-maker, day laborer, baker and a trumpet player for the Royal Imperial Band. The latter position allowed him to travel across Bolivia. At the end of his higher education he failed to collect his degree certificate. Although interested in studying journalism, he did not pursue it as a profession.

Morales served his mandatory military service in the Bolivian Army from 1977 to 1978. Initially signed up at the Centre for Instruction of Special Troops (CITE) in Cochabamba, he was sent into the Fourth Ingavi Cavalry Regiment and stationed at the army headquarters in the Bolivian capital La Paz. These two years were one of Bolivia's politically most unstable periods, with five presidents and two military coups, led by General Juan Pereda and General David Padilla respectively; under the latter's regime, Morales was stationed as a guard at the Palacio Quemado (Presidential Palace).

Early cocalero activism: 1978–1983 

Following his military service, Morales returned to his family, who had escaped the agricultural devastation of 1980's El Niño storm cycle by relocating to the Tropics of Cochabamba in the eastern lowlands. Setting up home in the town of Villa 14 de Septiembre, El Chapare, using a loan from Morales' maternal uncle, the family cleared a plot of land in the forest to grow rice, oranges, grapefruit, papaya, bananas and later on coca. It was here that Morales learned to speak Quechua, the indigenous local language. The arrival of the Morales family was a part of a much wider migration to the region; in 1981 El Chapare's population was 40,000 but by 1988 it had risen to 215,000. Many Bolivians hoped to set up farms where they could earn a living growing coca, which was experiencing a steady rise in price and which could be cultivated up to four times a year; a traditional medicinal and ritual substance in Andean culture, it was also sold abroad as the key ingredient in cocaine. Morales joined the local soccer team, before founding his own team, New Horizon, which proved victorious at the 2 August Central Tournament. The El Chapare region remained special to Morales for many years to come; during his presidency he often talked of it in speeches and regularly visited.

In El Chapare, Morales joined a trade union of cocaleros (coca growers), being appointed local Secretary of Sports. Organizing soccer tournaments, among union members he earned the nickname of "the young ball player" because of his tendency to organize matches during meeting recesses. Influenced in joining the union by wider events, in 1980 the far-right General Luis García Meza had seized power in a military coup, banning other political parties and declaring himself president; for Morales, a "foundational event in his relationship with politics" occurred in 1981, when a campesino (coca grower) was accused of cocaine trafficking by soldiers, beaten up, and burned to death. In 1982 the leftist Hernán Siles Zuazo and the Democratic and Popular Union (Unidad Democrática y Popular – UDP) took power in representative democratic elections, before implementing neoliberal capitalist reforms and privatizing much of the state sector with United States support; hyperinflation came under control, but unemployment rose to 25%. Becoming increasingly active in the union, from 1982 to 1983, Morales served as the general secretary of his local San Francisco syndicate. In 1983, Morales' father Dionisio died, and although he missed the funeral he temporarily retreated from his union work to organize his father's affairs.

As part of the War on Drugs, the United States government hoped to stem the cocaine trade by preventing the production of coca; they pressured the Bolivian government to eradicate it, sending troops to Bolivia to aid the operation. Bolivian troops would burn coca crops and in many cases beat up coca growers who challenged them. Angered by this, Morales returned to cocalero campaigning; like many of his comrades, he refused the US$2,500 compensation offered by the government for each acre of coca he eradicated. Deeply embedded in Bolivian culture, the campesinos had an ancestral relationship with coca and did not want to lose their most profitable means of subsistence. For them, it was an issue of national sovereignty, with the United States viewed as imperialists; activists regularly proclaimed "Long live coca! Death to the Yankees!" ("Causachun coca! Wañuchun yanquis!").

General Secretary of the Cocalero Union: 1984–1994 

From 1984 to 1985, Morales served as Secretary of Records for the movement, and in 1985 he became General Secretary of the August Second Headquarters.
From 1984 to 1991, the sindicatos embarked on a series of protests against the forced eradication of coca by occupying local government offices, setting up roadblocks, going on hunger strike, and organizing mass marches and demonstrations. Morales was personally involved in this direct activism and in 1984 was present at a roadblock where 3 campesinos were killed. In 1988, Morales was elected to the position of Executive Secretary of the Federation of the Tropics. In 1989, he spoke at a one-year commemoratory event of the Villa Tunari massacre in which 11 coca farmers had been killed by agents of the Rural Area Mobile Patrol Unit (Unidad Móvil Policial para Áreas Rurales – UMOPAR). The following day, UMOPAR agents beat Morales up, leaving him in the mountains to die, but he was rescued by other union members. To combat this violence, Morales concluded that an armed cocalero militia could launch a guerrilla war against the government, but he soon chose to pursue an electoral path. In 1992, he made various international trips to champion the cocalero cause, speaking at a conference in Cuba, and also traveling to Canada, during which he learned of his mother's death.

In his speeches, Morales presented the coca leaf as a symbol of Andean culture that was under threat from the imperialist oppression of the United States. In his view, the United States should deal with their domestic cocaine abuse problems without interfering in Bolivia, arguing that they had no right trying to eliminate coca, a legitimate product with many uses which played a rich role in Andean culture. In a speech, Morales told reporters "I am not a drug trafficker. I am a coca grower. I cultivate coca leaf, which is a natural product. I do not refine (it into) cocaine, and neither cocaine nor drugs have ever been part of the Andean culture". Morales has stated that "We produce our coca, we bring it to the main markets, we sell it and that's where our responsibility ends".

Morales presented the coca growers as victims of a wealthy, urban social elite who had bowed to United States pressure by implementing neoliberal economic reforms. He argued that these reforms were to the detriment of Bolivia's majority, and thus the country's representative democratic system of governance failed to reflect the true democratic will of the majority. This situation was exacerbated following the 1993 general election when the centrist Revolutionary Nationalist Movement (Movimiento Nacionalista Revolucionario – MNR) won the election and Gonzalo Sánchez de Lozada became president. He adopted a policy of "shock therapy", implementing economic liberalization and widescale privatization of state-owned assets. Sánchez also agreed with the U.S. DEA to relaunch its offensive against the Bolivian coca growers, committing Bolivia to eradicating  of coca by March 1994 in exchange for US$20 million worth of United States aid, something Morales stated would be opposed by the cocalero movement.

In August 1994, Morales was arrested; reporters present at the scene witnessed him being beaten and accosted with racial slurs by civil agents. Accused of sedition, in jail he began a dry hunger strike to protest his arrest. The following day, 3000 campesinos began a  march from Villa Tunari to La Paz. Morales would be freed on 7 September 1994, and soon joined the march, which arrived at its destination on 19 September 1994, where they covered the city with political graffiti. He was again arrested in April 1995 during a sting operation that rounded up those at a meeting of the Andean Council of Coca Producers that he was chairing on the shores of Lake Titicaca. Accusing the group of plotting a coup with the aid of Colombia's FARC and Peru's Shining Path, a number of his comrades were tortured, although no evidence of a coup was brought forth and he was freed within a week. He proceeded to Argentina to attend a seminar on liberation struggles.

Political rise

ASP, IPSP, and MAS: 1995–1999 
Members of the sindicato social movement first suggested a move into the political arena in 1986. This was controversial, with many fearing that politicians would co-opt the movement for personal gain. Morales began supporting the formation of a political wing in 1989, although a consensus in favor of its formation only emerged in 1993. On 27 March 1995, at the 7th Congress of the Unique Confederation of Rural Laborers of Bolivia (Confederación Sindical Única de Trabajadores Campesinos de Bolivia – CSUTCB), a "political instrument" (a term employed over "political party") was formed, named the Assembly for the Sovereignty of the Peoples (Asamblea por la Sobernía de los Pueblos – ASP). At the ASP's 1st Congress, the CSUTCB participated alongside three other Bolivian unions, representing miners, peasants and indigenous peoples. In 1996, Morales was appointed chairman of the Committee of the Six Federations of the Tropics of Cochabamba, a position that he retained until 2006.

Bolivia's National Electoral Court (Corte Nacional Electoral – CNE) refused to recognize the ASP, citing minor procedural infringements. The coca activists circumvented this problem by running under the banner of the United Left (IU), a coalition of leftist parties headed by the Communist Party of Bolivia (Partido Comunista Boliviano – PCB). They won landslide victories in those areas which were local strongholds of the movement, producing 11 mayors and 49 municipal councilors. Morales was elected to the Chamber of Deputies in the National Congress as a representative for El Chapare, having secured 70.1% of the local vote. In the national elections of 1997, the IU/ASP gained four seats in Congress, obtaining 3.7% of the national vote, with this rising to 17.5% in the department of Cochabamba. The election resulted in the establishment of a coalition government led by the right-wing Nationalist Democratic Action (Acción Democrática Nacionalista – ADN), with Hugo Banzer as president; Morales lambasted him as "the worst politician in Bolivian history".

Rising electoral success was accompanied by factional in-fighting, with a leadership contest emerging in the ASP between the incumbent Alejo Véliz and Morales, who had the electoral backing of the social movement's bases. The conflict led to a schism, with Morales and his supporters splitting to form their own party, the Political Instrument for the Sovereignty of the Peoples (Instrumento Político por la Soberanía de los Pueblos – IPSP). The movement's bases defected en masse to the IPSP, leaving the ASP to crumble and Véliz to join the center-right New Republican Force (Nueva Fuerza Republicana – NFR), for which Morales denounced him as a traitor to the cocalero cause. Continuing his activism, in 1998 Morales led another cocalero march from El Chapare to la Paz, and came under increasing criticism from the government, who repeatedly accused him of being involved in the cocaine trade and mocked him for how he spoke and his lack of education.

Morales came to an agreement with David Añez Pedraza, the leader of a defunct yet still registered falangist party named the Movement for Socialism (MAS); under this agreement, Morales and the Six Federaciónes could take over the party name, with Pendraza stipulating the condition that they must maintain MAS's own acronym, name and colors. Thus, the MAS and IPSP merged, becoming known as the Movement for Socialism – Political Instrument for the Sovereignty of the Peoples. The MAS would come to be described as "an indigenous-based political party that calls for the nationalization of industry, legalization of the coca leaf ... and fairer distribution of national resources." The party lacked the finance available to the mainstream parties, and so relied largely on the work of volunteers in order to operate. It was not structured like other political parties, instead operating as the political wing of the social movement, with all tiers in the movement involved in decision making; this form of organisation would continue until 2004.
In the December 1999 municipal elections, the MAS secured 79 municipal council seats and 10 mayoral positions, gaining 3.27% of the national vote, although 70% of the vote in Cochabamba.

Cochabamba protests: 2000–2002
In 2000, the Tunari Waters corporation doubled the price at which they sold water to Bolivian consumers, resulting in a backlash from leftist activist groups, including the cocaleros. Activists clashed with police and armed forces, in what was dubbed "the Water War", resulting in 6 dead and 175 wounded. Responding to the violence, the government removed the contract from Tunari and placed the utility under cooperative control. In ensuing years further violent protests broke out over a range of issues, resulting in more deaths both among activists and law enforcement. Much of this unrest was connected with the widespread opposition to economic liberalization across Bolivian society, with a common perception that it only benefited a small minority.

In the Andean High Plateau, a cocalero group launched a guerrilla uprising under the leadership of Felipe Quispe; an ethnic separatist, he and Morales disliked each other, with Quispe considering Morales to be a traitor and an opportunist for his willingness to cooperate with White Bolivians. Morales had not taken a leading role in these protests, but did use them to get across his message that the MAS was not a single-issue party, and that rather than simply fighting for the rights of the cocalero it was arguing for structural change to the political system and a redefinition of citizenship in Bolivia.

In August 2001, Banzer resigned due to terminal illness, and Jorge Quiroga took over as president. Under U.S. pressure, Quiroga sought to have Morales expelled from Congress by saying that Morales' inflammatory language had caused the deaths of two police officers in Sacaba near Cochabamba. He was unable to provide any evidence of Morales' culpability. 140 deputies voted for Morales' expulsion, which came about in 2002. Morales said that it "was a trial against Aymara and Quechas". MAS activists interpreted it as evidence of the pseudo-democratic credentials of the political class.

The MAS gained increasing popularity as a protest party, relying largely on widespread dissatisfaction with the existing mainstream political parties among Bolivians living in rural and poor urban areas. Morales recognized this, and much of his discourse focused on differentiating the MAS from the traditional political class. Their campaign was successful, and in the 2002 presidential election the MAS gained 20.94% of the national vote, becoming Bolivia's second largest party, being only 1.5% behind the victorious MNR, whose candidate, Gonzalo Sánchez de Lozada, became president. They won 8 seats in the Senate and 27 in the Chamber of Deputies. Now the leader of the political opposition, Morales focused on criticising government policies rather than outlining alternatives. He had several unconstructive meetings with Sánchez de Lozada, but met with Venezuela's Hugo Chávez for the first time.

Bolivia's U.S. embassy had become publicly highly critical of Morales; just prior to the election, the U.S. ambassador to Bolivia Manuel Rocha issued a statement declaring that U.S. aid to Bolivia would be cut if MAS won the election. However, exit polls revealed that Rocha's comments had served to increase support for Morales. Following the election, the U.S. embassy maintained this critical stance, characterising Morales as a criminal and encouraging Bolivia's traditional parties to sign a broad agreement to oppose the MAS; Morales himself began alleging that the U.S. Central Intelligence Agency was plotting to assassinate him.

Rise to prominence: 2003–2005

In 2003, the Bolivian gas conflict broke out as activists – including coca growers – protested against the privatization of the country's natural gas supply and its sale to U.S. companies below the market value. Activists blocked off the road into La Paz, resulting in clashes with police. 80 were killed and 411 injured, among them officers, activists, and civilians, including children. Morales did not take an active role in the conflict, instead traveling to Libya and Switzerland, there describing the uprising as a "peaceful revolution in progress". The government accused Morales and the MAS of using the protests to overthrow Bolivia's parliamentary democracy with the aid of organized crime, FARC, and the governments of Venezuela, Cuba, and Libya.

Morales led calls for President Sánchez de Lozada to step down over the death toll, gaining widespread support from the MAS, other activist groups, and the middle classes; with pressure building, Sánchez resigned and fled to Miami, Florida. He was replaced by Carlos Mesa, who tried to strike a balance between U.S. and cocalero demands, but whom Morales mistrusted. In November, Morales spent 24 hours with Cuban President Fidel Castro in Havana, and then met Argentinian President Nestor Kirchner. In the 2004 municipal election, the MAS became the country's largest national party, with 28.6% of all councilors in Bolivia. However, they failed to win the mayoralty in any big cities, reflecting their inability to gain widespread support among the urban middle-classes. In Bolivia's wealthy Santa Cruz region, a strong movement for autonomy had developed under the leadership of the Pro Santa Cruz Committee (Comite Pro Santa Cruz). Favorable to neoliberal economics and strongly critical of the cocaleros, they considered armed insurrection to secede from Bolivia should MAS take power.

In March 2005, Mesa resigned, citing the pressure of Morales and the cocalero road blocks and riots. Amid fears of civil war, Eduardo Rodríguez Veltzé became president of a transitional government, preparing Bolivia for a general election in December 2005. Hiring the Peruvian Walter Chávez as its campaign manager, the MAS electoral campaign was based on Salvador Allende's successful campaign in the 1970 Chilean presidential election. Measures were implemented to institutionalize the party structure, giving it greater independence from the social movement; this was done to allow Morales and other MAS leaders to respond quickly to new developments without the lengthy process of consulting the bases, and to present a more moderate image away from the bases' radicalism. Although he had initially hoped for a female running mate, Morales eventually chose Marxist intellectual Álvaro García Linera as his vice presidential candidate, with some Bolivian press speculating as to a romantic relationship between the two. MAS' primary opponent was Jorge Quiroga and his center-right Social and Democratic Power, whose campaign was centered in Santa Cruz and which advocated continued neo-liberal reform; Quiroga accused Morales of promoting the legalization of cocaine and being a puppet for Venezuela.

With a turnout of 84.5%, the election saw Morales gain 53.7% of the vote, while Quiroga came second with 28.6%; Morales' was the first victory with an absolute majority in Bolivia for 40 years and the highest national vote percentage of any presidential candidate in Latin American history. Given that he was the sixth self-described leftist president to be elected in Latin America since 1998, his victory was identified as part of the broader regional pink tide. Becoming president-elect, Morales was widely described as Bolivia's first indigenous leader, at a time when around 62% of the population identified as indigenous; political analysts therefore drew comparisons with the election of Nelson Mandela to the South African Presidency in 1994. This resulted in widespread excitement among the  indigenous people in the Americas, particularly those of Bolivia. His election caused concern among the country's wealthy and landowning classes, who feared state expropriation and nationalisation of their property, as well as far-right groups, who said it would spark a race war. He traveled to Cuba to spend time with Castro, before going to Venezuela, and then on tour to Europe, China, and South Africa; significantly, he avoided the U.S. In January 2006, Morales attended an indigenous spiritual ceremony at Tiwanaku where he was crowned Apu Mallku (Supreme Leader) of the Aymara, receiving gifts from indigenous peoples across Latin America. He thanked the goddess Pachamama for his victory and proclaimed that "With the unity of the people, we're going to end the colonial state and the neo-liberal model."

President (2006–2019)

First presidential term: 2006–2009

Morales' inauguration took place on 22 January in La Paz. It was attended by various heads of state, including Argentina's Kirchner, Venezuela's Chávez, Brazil's Lula da Silva, and Chile's Ricardo Lagos. Morales wore an Andeanized suit designed by fashion designer Beatriz Canedo Patiño, and gave a speech that included a minute silence in memory of cocaleros and indigenous activists killed in the struggle. He condemned Bolivia's former "colonial" regimes, likening them to South Africa under apartheid and stating that the MAS' election would lead to a "refoundation" of the country, a term that the MAS consistently used over "revolution". Morales repeated these views in his convocation of the Constituent Assembly.

In taking office, Morales emphasized nationalism, anti-imperialism, and anti-neoliberalism, although did not initially refer to his administration as socialist. He immediately reduced both his own presidential wage and that of his ministers by 57% to $1,875 a month, also urging members of Congress to do the same. Morales gathered together a largely inexperienced cabinet made up of indigenous activists and leftist intellectuals, although over the first three years of government there was a rapid turnover in the cabinet as Morales replaced many of the indigenous members with trained middle-class leftist politicians. By 2012 only 3 of the 20 cabinet members identified as indigenous.

Economic program
At the time of Morales' election, Bolivia was South America's poorest nation. Morales' government did not initiate fundamental change to Bolivia's economic structure, and their National Development Plan (PDN) for 2006–10 adhered largely to the country's previous liberal economic model. Bolivia's economy was based largely on the extraction of natural resources, with the nation having South America's second largest reserves of natural gas. Keeping to his election pledge, Morales took increasing state control of the hydrocarbon industry with Supreme Decree 2870; previously, corporations paid 18% of their profits to the state, but Morales symbolically reversed this, so that 82% of profits went to the state and 18% to the companies. The oil companies threatened to take the case to the international courts or cease operating in Bolivia, but ultimately relented. As a result, Bolivia's income from hydrocarbon extraction increased from $173 million in 2002 to $1.3 billion by 2006. Although not technically a form of nationalization, Morales and his government referred to it as such, resulting in criticism from sectors of the Bolivian left. In June 2006, Morales announced his plan to nationalize mining, electricity, telephones, and railroads. In February 2007, the government nationalized the Vinto metallurgy plant and refused to compensate Glencore, which the government said had obtained the contract illegally. Although the FSTMB miners' federation called for the government to nationalize the mines, the government did not do so, instead stating that any transnational corporations operating in Bolivia legally would not be expropriated.

Under Morales, Bolivia experienced unprecedented economic strength, resulting in an increase in value of its currency, the boliviano. Morales' first year in office ended with no fiscal deficit, which was the first time this had happened in Bolivia for 30 years. During the global financial crisis of 2007–08 Bolivia maintained one of the world's highest levels of economic growth. Such economic strength led to a nationwide boom in construction, and allowed the state to build up strong financial reserves. Although the level of social spending was increased, it remained relatively low, with a priority being the construction of paved roads and community spaces such as soccer fields and union buildings. In particular, the government focused on rural infrastructure improvement, to bring roads, running water, and electricity to areas that lacked them.

The government's stated intention was to reduce Bolivia's most acute poverty levels from 35% to 27% of the population, and moderate poverty levels from 58.9% to 49% over five years. The welfare state was expanded, as characterized by the introduction of non-contributory old-age pensions and payments to mothers provided their babies are taken for health checks and that their children attend school. Hundreds of free tractors were also handed out. The prices of gas and many foodstuffs were controlled, and local food producers were made to sell in the local market rather than export. A new state-owned body was also set up to distribute food at subsidized prices. All these measures helped to curb inflation, while the economy grew (partly because of rising public spending), accompanied by stronger public finances which brought economic stability.

During Morales' first term, Bolivia broke free of the domination of the World Bank and International Monetary Fund (IMF) which had characterized previous regimes by refusing their financial aid and connected regulations. In May 2007, it became the world's first country to withdraw from the International Center for the Settlement of Investment Disputes, with Morales stating that the institution had consistently favored multinational corporations in its judgments. Bolivia's lead was followed by other Latin American nations. Despite being encouraged to do so by the U.S., Bolivia refused to join the Free Trade Area of the Americas, deeming it a form of U.S. imperialism.

A major dilemma faced by Morales' administration was between the desire to expand extractive industries in order to fund social programs and provide employment, and to protect the country's environment from the pollution caused by those industries. Although his government professed an environmentalist ethos, expanding environmental monitoring and becoming a leader in the voluntary Forest Stewardship Council, Bolivia continued to witness rapid deforestation for agriculture and illegal logging. Economists on both the left and right expressed concern over the government's lack of economic diversification. Many Bolivians opined that Morales' government had failed to bring about sufficient job creation.

ALBA and international appearances

Morales' administration sought strong links with the governments of Cuba and Venezuela. In April 2005 Morales traveled to Havana for knee surgery, there meeting with the two nations' presidents, Castro and Chávez. In April 2006, Bolivia agreed to join Cuba and Venezuela in founding the Bolivarian Alternative for the Americas (ALBA), with Morales attending ALBA's conference in May, at which they initiated with a Peoples' Trade Agreement (PTA). Meanwhile, his administration became "the least US-friendly government in Bolivian history". In September Morales visited the U.S. for the first time to attend the UN General Assembly, where he gave a speech condemning U.S. President George W. Bush as a terrorist for launching the War in Afghanistan and Iraq War, and called for the UN Headquarters to be moved out of the country. In the U.S., he met with former presidents Bill Clinton and Jimmy Carter and with Native American groups. Relations were further strained between the two nations when in December Morales issued a Supreme Decree requiring all U.S. citizens visiting Bolivia to have a visa. His government also refused to grant legal immunity to U.S. soldiers in Bolivia; hence the U.S. cut back their military support to the country by 96%.

In December 2006, he attended the first South-South conference in Abuja, Nigeria, there meeting Libyan leader Muammar Gaddafi, whose government had recently awarded Morales the Al-Gaddafi International Prize for Human Rights. Morales proceeded straight to Havana for a conference celebrating Castro's life, where he gave a speech arguing for stronger links between Latin America and the Middle East to combat U.S. imperialism. Under his administration, diplomatic relations were established with Iran, with Morales praising Iranian President Mahmoud Ahmadinejad as a revolutionary comrade. In April 2007 he attended the first South American Energy Summit in Venezuela, arguing with many allies over the issue of biofuel, which he opposed. He had a particularly fierce argument with Brazilian President Lula over Morales' desire to bring Bolivia's refineries – which were largely owned by Brazil's Petrobrás – under state control. In May, Bolivia purchased the refineries and transferred them to the Bolivian State Petroleum Company (YPFB).

Social reform

Morales' government sought to encourage a model of development based upon the premise of vivir bien, or "to live well". This entailed seeking social harmony, consensus, the elimination of discrimination, and wealth redistribution; in doing so, it was rooted in communal rather than individual values and owed more to indigenous Andean forms of social organization than Western ones.

Upon Morales' election, Bolivia's illiteracy rate was at 16%, the highest in South America. Attempting to rectify this with the aid of left-wing allies, Bolivia launched a literacy campaign with Cuban assistance, and Venezuela invited 5,000 Bolivian high school graduates to study in Venezuela for free. By 2009, UNESCO declared Bolivia free from illiteracy. The World Bank stated that illiteracy had declined by 5%. Cuba also aided Bolivia in the development of its medical care, opening ophthalmological centers in the country to treat 100,000 Bolivians for free per year, and offering 5,000 free scholarships for Bolivian students to study medicine in Cuba. The government sought to expand state medical facilities, opening twenty hospitals by 2014, and increasing basic medical coverage up to the age of 25. Their approach sought to utilize and harmonize both mainstream Western medicine and Bolivia's traditional medicine.

The 2006 Bono Juancito Pinto program provided US$29 per year to parents who kept their children in public school with an attendance rate above 80%. 2008's Renta Dignidad initiative expanded the previous Bonosol social security for seniors program, increasing payments to $344 per year, and lowering the eligibility age from 65 to 60. 2009's Bono Juana Azurduy program expanded a previous public maternity insurance, giving cash to low-income mothers who proved that they and their baby had received pre- and post-natal medical care, and gave birth in an authorized medical facility. Conservative critics of Morales' government said that these measures were designed to buy off the poor and ensure continued support for the government, particularly the Bono Juancito Pinto which is distributed very close to election day.

Morales announced that one of the top priorities of his government was to eliminate racism against the country's indigenous population. To do this, he announced that all civil servants were required to learn one of Bolivia's three indigenous languages, Quechua, Aymara, or Guaraní, within two years. His government encouraged the development of indigenous cultural projects, and sought to encourage more indigenous people to attend university; by 2008, it was estimated that half of the students enrolled in Bolivia's 11 public universities were indigenous, while three indigenous-specific universities had been established, offering subsidized education. In 2009, a Vice Ministry for Decolonization was established, which proceeded to pass the 2010 Law against Racism and Discrimination banning the espousal of racist views in private or public institutions.
Various commentators noted that there was a renewed sense of pride among the country's indigenous population following Morales' election. Conversely, the opposition accused Morales' administration of aggravating racial tensions between indigenous, white, and mestizo populations, and of using the Racism and Discrimination law to attack freedom of the press.

On International Workers' Day 2006, Morales issued a presidential decree undoing aspects of the informalization of labor which had been implemented by previous neoliberal governments; this was seen as a highly symbolic act for labor rights in Bolivia. In 2009 his government put forward suggested reforms to the 1939 labor laws, although lengthy discussions with trade unions hampered the reforms' progress. Morales' government increased the legal minimum wage by 50%, and reduced the pension age from 65 to 60, and then in 2010 reduced it again to 58.

While policies were brought in to improve the living conditions of the working classes, conversely many middle-class Bolivians felt that they had seen their social standing decline, with Morales personally mistrusting the middle-classes, deeming them fickle. A 2006 law reallocated state-owned lands, with this agrarian reform entailing distributing land to traditional communities rather than individuals. In 2010, a law was introduced permitting the formation of recognized indigenous territories, although the implementation of this was hampered by bureaucracy and contesting claims over ownership. Morales' government also sought to improve women's rights in Bolivia. In 2010, it founded a Unit of Depatriarchalization to oversee this process. Further seeking to provide legal recognition and support to LGBT rights, it declared 28 June to be Sexual Minority Rights Day in the country, and encouraged the establishment of a gay-themed television show on the state channel.

Adopting a policy known as "Coca Yes, Cocaine No", Morales' administration ensured the legality of coca growing, and introduced measures to regulate the production and trade of the crop. In 2007, they announced that they would permit the growing of 50,000 acres of coca in the country, primarily for the purposes of domestic consumption, with each family being restricted to the growing of one cato (1600 meters squared) of coca.

A social control program was implemented whereby local unions took on responsibility for ensuring that this quota was not exceeded; in doing so, they hoped to remove the need for military and police intervention, and thus stem the violence of previous decades. Measures were implemented to ensure the industrialization of coca production, with Morales inaugurating the first coca industrialization plant in Chulumani, which produced and packaged coca and trimate tea; the project was primarily funded through a $125,000 donation from Venezuela under the PTA scheme.

These industrialization measures proved largely unsuccessful given that coca remained illegal in most nations outside Bolivia, thus depriving the growers of an international market. Campaigning against this, in 2012 Bolivia withdrew from the UN 1961 Convention which had called for global criminalisation of coca, and in 2013 successfully convinced the UN Single Convention on Narcotic Drugs to declassify coca as a narcotic. The U.S. State Department criticized Bolivia, saying that it was regressing in its counter-narcotics efforts, and dramatically reduced aid to Bolivia to $34 million to fight the narcotics trade in 2007. Nevertheless, the number of cocaine seizures in Bolivia increased under Morales' government, as they sought to encourage coca growers to report and oppose cocaine producers and traffickers. High levels of police corruption surrounding the illicit trade in cocaine remained a continuing problem for Bolivia.

Morales' government also introduced measures to tackle Bolivia's endemic corruption; in 2007, Morales issued a presidential decree to create the Ministry of Institutional Transparency and Fight Against Corruption. Critics said that MAS members were rarely prosecuted for the crime, the main exception being YPFB head Santos Ramírez, who was sentenced to twelve years imprisonment for corruption in 2008. A 2009 law that permitted the retroactive prosecution for corruption led to legal cases being brought against a number of opposition politicians for alleged corruption in the pre-Morales period and many fled abroad to avoid standing trial.

Domestic unrest and the new constitution
During his presidential campaign, Morales had supported calls for regional autonomy for Bolivia's departments. As president, he changed his position, viewing the calls for autonomy – which came from Bolivia's four eastern departments of Santa Cruz, Beni, Pando, and Tarija – as an attempt by the wealthy bourgeoisie living in these regions to preserve their economic position. He nevertheless agreed to a referendum on regional autonomy, held in July 2006; the four eastern departments voted in favor of autonomy, but Bolivia as a whole voted against it by 57.6%. In September, autonomy activists launched strikes and blockades across eastern Bolivia, resulting in violent clashes with MAS activists. In January 2007, clashes in Cochabamba between activist groups led to fatalities, with Morales' government sending in troops to maintain the peace. The left-indigenous activists formed a Revolutionary Departmental Government, but Morales denounced it as illegal and continued to recognize the legitimacy of right-wing departmental head Manfred Reyes Villa.

In July 2006, an election to form a Constitutional Assembly was held, which saw the highest ever electoral turnout in the nation's history. MAS won 137 of its 255 seats, after which the Assembly was inaugurated in August. The Assembly was the first elected parliamentary body in Bolivia which features strong campesino and indigenous representation. In November, the Assembly approved a new constitution, which converted the Republic of Bolivia into the Plurinational State of Bolivia, describing it as a "plurinational communal and social unified state". The constitution emphasized Bolivian sovereignty of natural resources, separated church and state, forbade foreign military bases in the country, implemented a two-term limit for the presidency, and permitted limited regional autonomy. It also enshrined every Bolivians' right to water, food, free health care, education, and housing. In enshrining the concept of plurinationalism, one commentator noted that it suggested "a profound reconfiguration of the state itself" by recognising the rights to self-determination of various nations within a single state.

In May 2008, the eastern departments pushed for greater autonomy, but Morales' government rejected the legitimacy of their position. They called for a referendum on recalling Morales, which saw an 83% turnout and in which Morales was ratified with 67.4% of the vote. Unified as the National Council for Democracy (CONALDE), these groups – financed by the wealthy agro-industrialist, petroleum, and financial elite – embarked on a series of destabilisation campaigns to unseat Morales' government. Unrest then broke out across eastern Bolivia, as radicalized autonomist activists established blockades, occupied airports, clashing with pro-government demonstrations, police, and armed forces. Some formed paramilitaries, bombing state companies, indigenous NGOs, and human rights organisations, also launching armed racist attacks on indigenous communities, culminating in the Pando Massacre of MAS activists. The autonomists gained support from some high-ranking politicians; Santa Cruz Governor Rubén Costas lambasted Morales and his supporters with racist epithets, accusing the president of being an Aymara fundamentalist and a totalitarian dictator responsible for state terrorism. Amid the unrest, foreign commentators began speculating on the possibility of civil war.

After it was revealed that USAID's Office of Transition Initiatives had supplied $4.5 million to the pro-autonomist departmental governments of the eastern provinces, in September 2008 Morales accused the U.S. ambassador to Bolivia, Philip Goldberg, of "conspiring against democracy" and encouraging the civil unrest, ordering him to leave the country. The U.S. government responded by expelling Bolivian ambassador to the U.S., Gustavo Guzman. Bolivia subsequently expelled the U.S. Drug Enforcement Administration (DEA) from the country, while the U.S. responded by withdrawing their Peace Corps. Chávez stood in solidarity with Bolivia by ordering the U.S. ambassador Patrick Duddy out of his country and withdrawing the Venezuelan ambassador to the U.S. The Union of South American Nations (UNASUR) convened a special meeting to discuss the Bolivian situation, expressing full support for Morales' government.

Although unable to quell the autonomist violence, Morales' government refused to declare a state of emergency, believing that the autonomists were attempting to provoke them into doing so. Instead, they decided to compromise, entering into talks with the parliamentary opposition. As a result, 100 of the 411 elements of the Constitution were changed, with both sides compromising on certain issues. Nevertheless, the governors of the eastern provinces rejected the changes, believing it gave them insufficient autonomy, while various Indianist and leftist members of MAS felt that the amendments conceded too much to the political right. The constitution was put to a referendum in January 2009, in which it was approved by 61.4% of voters.

Following the approval of the new Constitution, the 2009 general election was called. The opposition sought to delay the election by demanding a new biometric registry system, hoping that it would give them time to form a united front against MAS. Many MAS activists reacted violently against the demands, and attempting to prevent this. Morales went on a five-day hunger strike in April 2009 to push the opposition to rescind their demands. He also agreed to allow for the introduction of a new voter registry, but said that it was rushed through so as not to delay the election. Morales and the MAS won with a landslide majority, polling 64.2%, while voter participation had reached an all-time high of 90%. His primary opponent, Reyes Villa, gained 27% of the vote. The MAS won a two-thirds majority in both the Chamber of Deputies and the Senate. Morales notably increased his support in the east of the country, with MAS gaining a majority in Tarija. In response to his victory, Morales proclaimed that he was "obligated to accelerate the pace of change and deepen socialism" in Bolivia, seeing his re-election as a mandate to further his reforms.

Second presidential term: 2009–2014
During his second term, Morales began to speak openly of "communitarian socialism" as the ideology that he desired for Bolivia's future. He assembled a new cabinet which was 50% female, a first for Bolivia, although by 2012, that had dropped to a third. One of the main tasks that faced his government during this term was the aim of introducing legislation that would cement the extension of rights featured in the new constitution. In April 2010, the departmental elections saw further gains for MAS. In 2013, the government passed a law to combat domestic violence against women.

In December 2009, Morales attended the 2009 United Nations Climate Change Conference in Copenhagen, Denmark, where he blamed climate change on capitalism and called for a financial transactions tax to fund climate change mitigation. Ultimately deeming the conference to have been a failure, he oversaw the World's People Conference on Climate Change and the Rights of Mother Earth outside of Cochabamba in April 2010.

Following the victories of Barack Obama and the Democratic Party in the 2008 U.S. presidential election, relations between Bolivia and the U.S. improved slightly, and in November 2009 the countries entered negotiations to restore diplomatic relations. After the U.S. backed the 2011 military intervention in Libya by NATO forces, Morales condemned Obama, calling for his Nobel Peace Prize to be revoked. The two nations restored diplomatic relations in November 2011, although Morales refused to allow the DEA back into the country.

In October 2012, the government passed a Law of Mother Earth that banned genetically modified organisms (GMOs) being grown in Bolivia. This was praised by environmentalists and criticized by the nation's soya growers, who said that it would make them less competitive on the global market.

In July 2013, Morales attended a summit in Moscow where he said he was open to offering political asylum to Edward Snowden, who was staying in the Moscow airport at the time. On 2 July 2013, while travelling back to Bolivia from the summit, his presidential plane was forced to land in Austria when Portuguese, French, Spanish and Italian authorities denied it access to their airspace. Bolivian Foreign Minister David Choquehuanca said the European states had acted on "unfounded suspicions that Mr. Snowden was on the plane". The Organisation of American States condemned "actions that violate the basic rules and principles of international law such as the inviolability of Heads of State", and demanded that the European governments explain their actions and apologise. An emergency meeting of the Union of South American Nations denounced "the flagrant violation of international treaties" by European powers. Latin American leaders describe the incident as a "stunning violation of national sovereignty and disrespect for the region". Morales himself described the incident as a "hostage" situation. France apologised for the incident the next day. Snowden said that the forced grounding of Morales plane may have prompted Russia to allow him to leave the Moscow airport.

In 2014, Morales became the oldest active professional soccer player in the world after signing a contract for $200 a month with Sport Boys Warnes.

On 31 July 2014, Morales condemned the 2014 Israel–Gaza conflict and declared Israel a "terrorist state".

Domestic protests

Morales' second term was heavily affected by infighting and dissent from within his support base, as indigenous and leftist activists rejected several government reforms. In May 2010, his government announced a 5% rise in the minimum wage. The Bolivian Workers' Central (COB) felt this insufficient given the rising cost of living, calling a general strike, while protesters clashed with police. The government refused to increase the rise, accusing protesters of being pawns of the right. In August 2010, violent protests broke out in southern Potosí over widespread unemployment and a lack of infrastructure investment. In December 2010, the government cut subsidies for gasoline and diesel fuels, which raised fuel prices and transport costs. Protests led Morales to nullify the decree, responding that he "ruled by obeying". In June 2012, Bolivia's police launched protests against anti-corruption reforms to the police service; they burned disciplinary case records and demanded salary increases. Morales' government relented, canceling many of the proposed reforms and agreeing to the wage rise.

In 2011, the government announced it had signed a contract with a Brazilian company to construct a highway connecting Beni to Cochabamba, which would pass through the Isiboro Sécure National Park and Indigenous Territory (TIPNIS). This would better integrate the Beni and Pando departments with the rest of Bolivia and facilitate hydrocarbons exploration. The plan brought condemnation from environmentalists and indigenous communities living in the TIPNIS, who said that it would encourage deforestation and illegal settlement and that it violated the constitution and United Nations Declaration on the Rights of Indigenous Peoples. The issue became an international cause célèbre and cast doubt on the government's environmentalist and indigenous rights credentials. In August, 800 protesters embarked on a protest march from Trinidad to La Paz; many were injured in clashes with police and supporters of the road. Two government ministers and other high-ranking officials resigned in protest and Morales' government relented, announcing suspension of the road. In October 2011, he passed Law 180, prohibiting further road construction, although the government proceeded with a consultation, eventually gaining the consent of 55 of the 65 communities in TIPNIS to allow the highway to be built, albeit with a variety of concessions; construction was scheduled to take place after the 2014 general election. In May 2013, the government announced that it would permit hydrocarbon exploration in Bolivia's 22 national parks, to widespread condemnation from environmentalists.

Third presidential term: 2014–2019
In 2008, Morales stated that he would not stand for re-election in the 2014 general election. The 2009 Bolivian constitution places a term limit of two consecutive presidential terms. However, a 2013 ruling by the Plurinational Constitutional Court held that Morales' first term did not count towards the term limit, because it had taken place prior to the ratification of the 2009 constitution. The court ruling, which was criticized by opposition politicians, allowed Morales to run for a third term as president. After standing for re-election and proclaiming victory, Morales declared it "a triumph of the anti-colonialists and anti-imperialists" and dedicated his win to both Castro and Chávez.On the basis of this victory, the Financial Times remarked that Morales was "one of the world's most popular leaders". On 17 October 2015, Morales surpassed Andrés de Santa Cruz's nine years, eight months, and twenty-four days in office and became Bolivia's longest serving president. Writing in The Guardian, Ellie Mae O'Hagan attributes his enduring popularity not to anti-imperialist rhetoric but his "extraordinary socio-economic reforms," which resulted in poverty and extreme poverty declining by 25% and 43% respectively. Bolivia's newly implemented universal healthcare system has been cited as a model for all by the World Health Organization.

In early February 2016 there were rumors that Morales had had a child with a young woman, Gabriela Zapata Montaño, and had granted favors to the Chinese company that she worked for. Morales said that they had had a son who died in infancy, but that he had not granted any favors and had not been in contact with Zapata Montaño since 2007. The commission that investigated the issue concluded that Morales was not at fault. Zapata Montaño was later sentenced to ten years in prison for illegal financial behavior.

Morales attended the swearing-in ceremony of Venezuela's president Nicolás Maduro for his second term on 10 January 2019. In April 2019, Morales condemned the arrest of WikiLeaks founder Julian Assange.

New presidential offices 

Controversy arose when a new $34 million presidential skyscraper office and residence, the Casa Grande del Pueblo, was constructed in the historical Plaza Murillo. The proposal was initially declined due to municipal height restrictions in the historical district, though Morales' parliamentary majority in the Plurinational Legislative Assembly overrode the ban, permitting the tower's construction. The Casa Grande del Pueblo was inaugurated by Morales on 9 August 2018.

It was designed by Bolivian architects and decorated with indigenous motifs representing traditional Bolivian culture. The skyscraper was built to replace the former presidential palace, which Morales planned to turn into a museum. The building features a helipad and the top two floors were reserved for the president, featuring a gym, spa, Jacuzzi and private elevator. According to Diario Pagina Siete, Morales' bedroom was the same size as the average home provided by his government housing project.

Many analysts and opposition politicians of Morales criticised the spending due to the high levels of poverty in Bolivia. NPR described the new residence as "a luxurious new skyscraper" and that critics contend that "Morales is acting more like an emperor than a president", while Reuters wrote that Morales "alienated those who once backed him, especially by building the ostentatious presidential palace". Bolivian Cardinal Toribio Ticona Porco dubbed the tower "Evo Palace" and criticized the opulence invested into it.

After signing the contract for the new building, Morales stated that it was "not a luxury" since it would also house offices for different ministries, cabinet meeting rooms, a center for indigenous ceremonies and a 1,000-seat auditorium as well as rooms for exclusive presidential use. He also stated that the project would reduce government spending by $20 million per year as five other ministries would move into the building. He said the Casa Grande del Pueblo was a break with the past and described the previous residence, the Palacio Quemado or "Burnt Palace", as a vestige of colonialism and a symbol of neoliberal governments that stripped the State of its wealth, its heritage and its memory.  Morales' communication minister Gísela López responded to criticism, stating that the tower was "a necessity for the people".

2019 election controversy and resignation 

Despite Morales' declaration in 2014 that he would not attempt to alter the constitution so that he could serve a fourth term, Morales began exploring legal efforts to make a fourth term possible in 2015.

2016 referendum on term limits

Morales' party, the Movement for Socialism (MAS), sponsored an effort to amend the constitution by national vote. A referendum was authorized by a combined session of the Plurinational Legislative Assembly on 26 September 2015, by a vote of 112 to 41. On 21 February 2016 the referendum was held on a constitutional amendment to allow presidents to serve three consecutive terms, which would have allowed Morales to run for a fourth term (third under the new constitution). The proposed constitutional amendment narrowly lost.

2017 Supreme Constitutional Tribunal ruling 
Despite the referendum loss and Morales' earlier statement that he would not seek a fourth term if he lost the referendum, in December 2016 MAS nominated Morales as their candidate for the 2019 presidential election, stating that they would seek various avenues to ensure the legality of Morales' candidacy. In September 2017, MAS petitioned the Plurinational Constitutional Court to abolish term limits, based on the reasoning that term limits are a human rights violations under the American Convention on Human Rights (ACHR), a binding multilateral treaty. In November, the Court accepted the grounds of the petition. The ruling enabled Morales to submit his application as a presidential candidate to the Bolivian Electoral Tribunal, who then accepted his application and approved his candidacy.

Critics said that both courts had been stacked with Morales loyalists, some of whom received favorable positions in the government following these decisions.

In response to the decision by the Plurinational Constitutional Court, the Secretary General of the Organization of American States, Luis Almagro, stated that the clause in the American Convention on Human Rights cited by the Court "does not mean the right to perpetual power". In 2019, Almagro publicly supported Morales' participation in the 2019 election, saying that "presidents [in other countries]...have taken part in electoral processes on the grounds of a court ruling". Opposition leader Samuel Doria Medina called the decision "a blow to the constitution". The court of the ACHR in 2018 reviewed and upheld the legality of term limits, automatically triggering reinstatement of Bolivian term limit laws. The Bolivian Electoral Tribunal had already accepted Morales' application and declined to void his candidacy.

Between 28 and 30 September 2020, the Inter-American Court met in an advisory hearing to make a subsequent ruling on whether indefinite re-election as a human right was in compliance with the American Convention on Human Rights. At the virtual hearing, the IACHR argued against the ruling of the Bolivian Supreme court, saying "indefinite reelection is contrary to the American Convention due to its negative effects on representative democracy" and "States have the obligation to limit it (reelection). The alternation in power is the basis of representative democracy". Speaking at the hearing, former Bolivian President, Tuto Quiroga said that the primary objective of the convention was to protect citizens, not be an instrument of "a tyrant". None of those that submitted the appeal to the Plurinational Constitutional court appeared at the hearing to defend their position.

2019 election 

A general election was held on 20 October 2019.
From 21 October 2019 until late November, mass street protests and counterprotests occurred in response to claims of electoral fraud. The claims were made after the suspension of the preliminary vote count, in which Morales was not leading by a large enough margin (10%) to avoid an automatic runoff, and the subsequent publication of the official count, according to which he won by just over 10%. The final count, released on 25 October 2019, gave Morales 47.08% of the votes, with 36.51% for runner-up Carlos Mesa.

Disputes about the results began on election night, when there was an unexplained 20 hour break in transmission of the results, leading to widespread protests across the country. Responding to concerns about vote tampering and protests, Morales asked the Organization of American States (OAS) to conduct an audit of the vote count. Morales said he would call for a second-round runoff vote with Mesa if the OAS' audit found evidence of fraud.

Re-evaluation of OAS findings 
In June 2020, a group of independent researchers in the United States published a report stating that the OAS's conclusion about the voting trend indicating election fraud was false and based on statistical errors and incorrect data; their findings were published in the peer-reviewed Journal of Politics in 2022. The researchers from Center for Economic and Policy Research (CEPR), made up of a group of political scientists and experts on Latin American politics, concluded that there was "no statistical evidence of fraud" during the 2019 elections. The study found that it was "very likely" that Morales’ first-round election victory was legitimate. The New York Times subsequently reported on these findings. The study was criticized by the Secretary General of the OAS, Luis Almagro, by the Argentinian newspaper La Nación and by Ricardo Kirschbaum writing in Clarín as fake news.

On 15 October 2020, a study by Gary A. Hoover from the University of Oklahoma and Diego Escobari from the University of Texas found that there was evidence of a "statistically significant electoral case of fraud" that increased the votes of MAS and reduced the votes of the opposition. In a survey conducted in June 2020 by the company IPSOS, for the Unión Nacional de Instituciones para el Trabajo de Acción Social (UNITAS), 73% of respondents agreed with the statement that there had been fraud in the October 2019 elections.

The Bolivian government commissioned a report from the Bisite Deep Tech Lab Research Group of the University of Salamanca. The group's report was delivered in July 2021 and found that there was no manipulation of data in the official count or in the Transmission of Preliminary Electoral Results (TREP). After receiving the report, the Bolivian Attorney General's Office initially closed its investigation of electoral fraud in the 2019 elections. The Secretary General of the Attorney General's Office later said that the investigation was still open. Juan Manuel Corchado Rodríguez, who conducted the study, stated that there were irregularities in aspects of the process, including in the stoppage of the TREP and the breaking of custody of electoral tally sheets, but claimed there was no evidence of fraud or proof that these irregularities significantly altered the outcome.

Resignation and political asylum 
Morales resigned as president on 10 November 2019; he called his removal "forced" and a "coup" but also said that he wanted to stop bloodshed from the election protests. He made the announcement from El Chapare, a coca-growing rural area of Cochabamba where he had sought refuge. Mexico immediately offered him political asylum as "his life and safety are at risk" in Bolivia. Armed intruders broke into Morales’ home in Cochabamba and he accused "coup plotters" of an arson attack on his sister's home and of putting a price of $50,000 on his head. He said his fellow socialist leaders were being "harassed, persecuted and threatened". He thanked Mexican President Andres Manuel Lopez Obrador, whom he credited with saving his life.

On 11 November, a Mexican government plane flew Morales out of Cochabamba, refuelling in Paraguay before arriving in Mexico. In December, Morales moved from Mexico to Argentina, where he was also granted political asylum. Later that month, an arrest warrant was issued for Morales by Bolivian prosecutors for alleged sedition and terrorism. The interim government alleged that Morales promoted violent clashes in the country before and after he left office. In February 2020, Morales announced that he would run for a seat in the Plurinational Legislative Assembly in the 2020 Bolivian general election. On 20 February however, the national electoral tribunal ruled that Morales was ineligible to run for Senate. In September 2020, Human Rights Watch reported that it had found no evidence that Morales committed acts of terrorism and described the charges against him as politically motivated. In October 2020, the charges were dropped and the arrest warrant dismissed when a court in La Paz found Morales' rights had been violated and judicial procedures breached.

Post-presidency (2019–present)

Return to Bolivia

One day after new president Luis Arce was sworn into office, on 9 November 2020 Morales returned to Bolivia after 11 months abroad.

Early decisions made by the Arce administration as well as MAS itself indicated that Morales' influence in the party had declined. In late November and early December 2020, MAS officials began the process of selecting party candidates to run in the 2021 Bolivian regional elections. In four departments (Chuquisaca, Potosí, Cochabamba, and Pando), candidates for governor endorsed by Morales were not chosen by MAS officials. On 11 December, Morales tweeted Miguel "Chiquitín" Becerra would be the MAS candidate for Governor of Pando. This was met by surprise by MAS officials in Pando as Becerra had not even entered the list of candidates voted on as he did not meet the minimum membership requirement of eight years in the party. Instead, Germán Richter had been chosen as the candidate 5 days prior on 7 December. On 14 December, MAS officials in Tarija and Santa Cruz proclaimed Rodolfo Meyer and Adriana Salvatierra as candidates for mayor of those cities before Morales had had the opportunity to arrive.

The same day in the town of Lauca, Morales participated in a meeting to nominate a candidate for Governor of Santa Cruz. Though Morales initially endorsed former Mayor of Warnes, Mario Cronenbold, he withdrew his support when Cronenbold made statements in favor of not prosecuting Luis Fernando Camacho, an anti-Morales activist. Instead, Morales endorsed former Minister of Government Carlos Romero as a candidate for governor; however, the announcement of the appointment of Romero was rejected by the meeting's participants with shouts calling for renewal. The discontent ultimately resulted in one person throwing a plastic chair at Morales in what was dubbed the "silletazo." Morales blamed the incident on opposition party backers who infiltrated the rally. Half an hour later, Romero was withdrawn as a candidate and Morales announced television presenter Pedro García as the new nominee. However, the following day MAS bases and grassroots social organizations ratified Mario Cronenbold as their candidate for governor in opposition to García.

The "silletazo" was met by various reactions within and outside of the party. Former UD Deputy Rafael Quispe affirmed that the event showed that Morales has "finished his cycle and ... should go home." Civic Community Senator Andrea Barrientos claimed that the incident proved that "the people have lost their fear of Evo Morales," emphasizing that Morales' continued presence was a detriment not only to the country but to MAS as well. Segundina Flores, former MAS Deputy and executive of the Bartolina Sisa Confederation of Women, stated that Morales "deserves respect" and people "cannot be bouncing around with chairs." However, she also pointed out that the picking of candidates should not be done by the pointing of a finger and that there must be transparency.

As a result of these disputes, protesters in Potosí, El Alto, and Cochabamba expressed their disagreement with decisions that came out of meetings chaired by Morales. At a protest in El Alto on 15 December, MAS supporters rejected continued interference by Morales in the selection of candidates. "Evo wants to nominate other people that not even the people have asked for, we will not allow that anymore. Stop already. El Alto has supported him, now let new people work," said one protester. Toribio Huanca Mamani, executive member of the Red Ponchos of the Omasuyos province of La Paz stated that "Evo should not get involved in the elections."

COVID-19 
On 12 January 2021, Kawsachun Coca radio, the official radio station of the federation of coca growers, released a statement confirming that Morales had tested positive for COVID-19 but that he was "stable and receiving treatment." The report contradicted Morales' own statement the day prior in which he told Argentine journalist Juan Cruz Castiñeiras that claims that he had contracted the virus were "invented" by the right and that he "just had a cough problem, nothing more." He was discharged from the Los Olivos private clinic on 27 January.

Congressional pardon 
In a session of the Plurinational Legislative Assembly held on 12 February 2021, the majority of the Movement for Socialism approved the Presidential Decree for the Granting of Amnesty and Pardon for Humanitarian Reasons and Political Persecuted Persons, granting amnesty to those prosecuted during the government of Jeanine Áñez. The broad pardon, which included Morales, was met by shouts of "democracy yes, dictatorship no" by members of the opposition who objected to the fact that at noon, discussion was ended, beginning the vote, leaving several assemblymen without a chance to speak.

Statutory rape investigation

Morales has faced two rape accusations. On 7 August 2020, several photographs of him with a supposed minor came to light and began circulating on social networks. Journalist Alejandro Entreambasaguas and Bolivian authorities said that Morales had been in a relationship with the minor since the age of 14. Several news organisations relate the current accusations with comments that Morales had made twice previously on retiring with a quinceañera (15-year-old) when he was no longer president. In 2018, Bolivian feminist and journalist, María Galindo, criticised the then president, saying "The president (Morales) confesses that he uses his public acts to sexually hook the minors who attend those acts. But you have to ask yourself, why does he say it publicly, on a television channel, without any pressure?".

The Ministry of Government subsequently informed the Spanish newspaper Okdiario that it had opened a statutory rape investigation to determine whether a romantic and sexual relationship existed between the young woman and Morales while he was president of Bolivia. Morales refused to comment on the case during a telephone interview with the Spanish newspaper. On 19 August 2020, the Bolivian Prosecutor's Office began a formal investigation.

The woman was later identified as 19-year-old Noemí Meneses when a statement to police was leaked. In the statement she said she had been in a romantic relationship with Morales since May 2020, and had no previous relations with him. The Bolivian police subsequently placed her under house arrest from which she escaped and fled to Argentina with her parents. After arriving in Argentina, Meneses wrote a letter to the Bolivian Ombudsman saying that the police had kept her from eating for two days and threatened to prosecute her for sedition and terrorism unless she said that she had been in a relationship with Morales. She wrote that the police had "forced [her] to testify under pressure, without a lawyer". Alleged evidence to corroborate a long-term romantic relationship between Morales and Meneses was obtained and subsequently published by Bolivian and Spanish press, including excerpts from 101 pages of text conversations and phone records between the two, 90 photos of the pair in various locations (including the presidential palace, the presidential jet and in Buenos Aires) and travel receipts of three trips by Meneses to Mexico and Argentina since Morales' exile. Several sources note that Washington Post journalist, John Lee Anderson, mentions a young girl in Evo's company which was alluded to be Meneses. Evo and the girl exchanged glances and Anderson noted that "At some point, Morales interrupted our conversation to tell my photographer not to take photos of the woman". Anderson later affirmed the girl as being Meneses and stated that he chose the inclusion of her appearance in his article very carefully. The 2020 MAS presidential candidate, Luis Arce Catacora, confirmed that he took a photo with Meneses during Morales' exile in Buenos Aires, but denied knowing her identity. Meneses says she met Evo Morales when she was 16 years old during the 2015 carnival season. The declaration data indicates that she was born in 2001, implying that she was 14 years old when she met Morales. The circumstances of her arrest are further disputed as well as the use of a stolen government vehicle.

On 21 August 2020, an unrelated complaint of a second statutory rape case was filed against Morales. In this complaint, it is claimed that Morales had a child with a 15 year old and that he is named as the father on the birth certificate. In response, Morales claimed that the complaint was part of a "dirty war" by the interim government against him.

Political ideology

Figures in the Morales government have described the President's approach to politics as "Evoism" (Spanish: Evismo). From 2009, Morales has advocated "communitarian socialism", while political scientist Sven Harten characterized Morales' ideology as "eclectic", drawing ideas from "various ideological currents". Harten noted that whilst Morales uses fierce anti-imperialist and leftist rhetoric, he is neither "a hardcore anti-globalist nor a Marxist", not having argued for the violent and absolute overthrow of capitalism or U.S. involvement in Latin America.

Economically, Morales' policies have sometimes been termed "Evonomics" and have focused on creating a mixed economy. Morales' presidential discourse has revolved around distinguishing between "the people", of whom he sees himself as a representative, and the oppressive socio-economic elite and the old political class, whom he believes have mistreated "the people" for centuries. Morales sought to make Bolivia's representative democracy more direct and communitarian, through the introduction of referendums and a citizen-led legislative initiative. George Philip and Francisco Panizza wrote that like his allies Correa and Chávez, Morales should be categorized as a populist, because he appealed "directly to the people against their countries' political and economic order, divided the social field into antagonistic camps and promised redistribution and recognition in a newly founded political order."

Various commentators have argued against categorizing the Morales administration as socialist. Bolivia's Marxist Vice President Álvaro García Linera says that Bolivia lacks the sufficiently large industrialized working class, or proletariat, to enable it to convert into a socialist society in the Marxist understanding of the word. Instead, he terms the government's approach "Andean and Amazonian capitalism". Marxist American sociologist James Petras has argued that Morales' government is neither socialist nor anti-imperialist, instead describing Morales as a "radical conservative" for utilizing socialist rhetoric while continuing to support foreign investment and the economic status of Bolivia's capitalist class, while British Trotskyist academic Jeffery R. Webber wrote that Morales was not a socialist and his government was "reconstituting neoliberalism", thereby rejecting "neoliberal orthodoxy" but retaining a "core faith in the capitalist market as the principal engine of growth and industrialization." Similarly, Aymara activist Felipe Quispe characterized Morales' government as "neoliberalism with an Indian [i.e. indigenous] face".

Personality and personal life

Morales is ethnically Aymara, and has been widely described as Bolivia's first democratically elected president from the indigenous majority. Although Morales has sometimes been described as the first indigenous president to be democratically elected in Latin America, Benito Juárez, a Mexican of the Zapotec ethnic group, was elected President of Mexico in 1858. Biographer Martín Sivak described Morales as "incorruptible, charismatic, and combative", also noting that he had a "friendly style" and could develop a good rapport with journalists and photographers, in part because he could "articulate his opinions with simplicity". He also placed a great emphasis on trust, and relied on his intuition, sometimes acting on what he considered omens in his dreams. Harten said that Morales "can be a forceful leader, one who instills great respect and, sometimes, a reluctance in others to contradict him, but he has also learnt to listen and learn from other people." Farthing and Kohl characterized Morales as a "charismatic populist" of a kind common in Latin American history, who prioritized "a direct relationship" between the population and the leader.

Morales is not married and upon becoming president selected his older sister, Esther Morales Ayma, to adopt the role of First Lady of Bolivia. He has two children from different mothers. They are his daughter Eva Liz Morales Alvarado and son Álvaro Morales Paredes. Politician Juan del Granado is Eva Liz's godfather. His children left Bolivia and traveled to Buenos Aires in late November 2019. Esther Morales died on 16 August 2020, after contracting COVID-19.

Morales has commented that he is only a Roman Catholic in order "to go to weddings", and when asked if he believed in God, responded that "I believe in the land. In my father and my mother. And in cuchi-cuchi." According to some, Morales lives an ascetic life, with little interest in material possessions. Morales is  an association football enthusiast and plays the game frequently, often with local teams.

Morales' unorthodox behavior contrasts with the usual manners of dignitaries and other political leaders in Latin America. During speeches he made use of personal stories and anecdotes, and used coca as a political symbol, wearing a coca leaf garland around his neck and a hat with coca leaves in it when speaking to crowds of supporters. Following his election, he wore striped jumpers rather than the suits typically worn by politicians. It became a symbol of Morales, with copies of it selling widely in Bolivia.

On 4 July 2018, Morales underwent emergency surgery at a private clinic in La Paz in order to remove a tumor.

Influence and legacy

Morales has been described as "the most famous Bolivian ever", whose personality has become "fixed in the global imagination". Morales' government has been seen as part of the pink tide of left-leaning Latin American governments, becoming particularly associated with the hard left current of Venezuela and Cuba. It has been praised for its pro-socialist stance among the international left, who have taken an interest in Bolivia under his leadership as a "political laboratory" or "a living workshop" for the development of an alternative to capitalism. Domestically, Morales' support base has been among Bolivia's poor and indigenous communities. For these communities, who had felt marginalized in Bolivian politics for decades, Morales "invokes a sense of dignity and destiny" in a way that no other contemporary politician has done. He has received the support of many democratic socialists and social democrats, as well as sectors of Bolivia's liberal movement, who have been critical of Morales but favored him over the right-wing opposition.

Based on interviews conducted among Bolivians in 2012, John Crabtree and Ann Chaplin described the previous years of Morales' rule with the observation that: "for many—perhaps most—Bolivians, this was a period when ordinary people felt the benefits of policy in ways that had not been the case for decades, if ever." Crabtree and Chaplin added that Morales' administration had made "important changes... that will probably be difficult to reverse", including poverty reduction, the removal of some regional inequalities, and side-lining of some previously dominant political actors in favor of others who had been encouraged and enabled by his government.

Critics, particularly in the U.S. government, have varyingly termed him "a left-wing radical, a partner of narco-traffickers and a terrorist". Domestic opposition to Morales' governance has centered in the wealthy eastern lowland province of Santa Cruz. His policies often antagonized middle-class Bolivians, who deemed them too radical and argued that they threatened private property. His most vociferous critics have been from Bolivia's conservative movement, although he has also received criticism from the country's far left, who believe his reformist policies have been insufficiently radical or socialist. Many of these leftist critics were unhappy that Morales' government did not make a total break with global capitalism. His government has also faced many of the same complaints directed at previous Bolivian administrations, revolving around such issues as "concentration of power, corruption, incompetent bureaucracies, and disrespect for civil liberties".

Crabtree and Chaplin's study led them to conclude that while Morales' initial election had brought "huge expectations" from many Bolivians, especially in the social movements, there had been "inevitable frustrations" at his administration's inability to deliver on everything that they had hoped. They thought that the "heady optimism" that had characterized Morales' first term in office had given way to "a climate of questioning and growing criticism of the government and its policies". Crabtree and Chaplin claimed that though the Bolivian economy had grown, the material benefits had not been as high as many Bolivians had hoped. Crabtree and Chaplin argued that the experiences of his administration had "drawn attention to the difficulties involved in bringing change in the patterns of development in one of Latin America's poorest and most unequal nations". Similarly, Harten thought that Morales' discourse of "the people" against the socio-economic elites has brought a spotlight on the deep social polarization in Bolivia.

Morales promised to "help bring power" to marginalised groups in Bolivia, a country which has the highest percentage of indigenous population of any country in the Americas. His presidency saw poverty reduced by 42% and extreme poverty reduced by 60%. Mark Schneider of the Center for Strategic and International Studies' Americas Program, said that there was no question that Morales's government was successful in helping to raise the living standards of the poor population which was synonymously the indigenous population. Professor Robert Albro described Morales's legacy as "transformation of Bolivian society through the enfranchisement of the country’s indigenous population."

Pragmatic socialism
Morale's brand of pragmatic socialism was a program that was one of many among the pink tide that swept throughout the Latin American continent in the 2000s, where a number of left-wing leaders rose to power with socialist and social democratic leanings. Morales was opposed to neoliberal policies of austerity and privatization, and after coming into office in 2006, his administration nationalised the oil and gas sector. Using the funds derived from the nationalised natural gas and oil businesses, his administration invested heavily in basic sanitation, agriculture, education, water resources, transportation and health with the strategic goal to tackle the structural causes of poverty. By 2014, Morales' anti-poverty programs won him wide support as the country saw poverty reduced by 25%, extreme poverty reduced by 43%, social spending being increased by over 45%, and the real minimum wage being increased by 87.7%. According to the Center for Economic and Policy Research in Washington in regards to Bolivia's economy during Morales's governance, "Bolivia has grown much faster over the last eight years than in any period over the past three and a half decades."

Authoritarianism
Under Morales, Bolivia experienced democratic backsliding. According to a 2013 study, "Evo Morales and his Movement Toward Socialism have used trumped-up charges of administrative irregularities, corruption, terrorism, and genocide against numerous opposition politicians, imprisoning some, driving many others out of the country, and intimidating the rest. The competitiveness that is essential to democracy cannot survive in such a hostile setting." Some scholars characterized Bolivia under Morales as a competitive authoritarian regime.

Allegations of creating a narco-state

Morales has faced criticism concerning his links with the coca farming in Bolivia and alleged links with the illegal cocaine trafficking market. These range from Morales "closing his eyes to a drug-trafficking problem that is only getting worse" to open accusations that he is facilitating a narco-state. In 2008, two years into his first term as president, he expelled the DEA from the country. Between them, Colombia, Bolivia and Peru produce almost all of the world's cocaine. The coca growers unions are allegedly the main drug suppliers for the international market.

From 2003 to 2011, the area used for growing coca illicitly increased year on year but declined to reach a 12-year low in 2015 at 20,400 hectares. In subsequent years, however, illicit coca productions continued to rise to 24,500 hectare in 2017. In 2017, Morales signed a law that increased the legal amount of land in Bolivia designated to coca farming from 12,000 hectares to 22,000 hectares, a figure which has since been exceeded. A 2014 study by the EU estimated only 14,700 hectares was used for chewing and teas. Between 2018 and 2019, the area used for coca farming increased from 23,100 hectares to 25,500, an increase of 10.39%, prompting concern from the EU. The estimated tonnage of coca produced for commercial purposes increased from 19,334 tonnes in 2008 to 24,178 tonnes in 2018, an overall increase of 31.85%. A 2019 UN report said that 94% of coca production in the Chapare, the largest coca region of Bolivia, did not pass through the designated legal market in Sacaba. For Bolivia as a whole, 65% of coca trade was undocumented, accounting for 55,000 tonnes of dry coca leaves. The 2019 report by UNODC also reports increases in the area used for coca farming of up to 171% in five protected areas.

Observers alleged that corruption among political figures and low-level criminal activity associated with the cocaine trade is normal with researcher Diego Ayo from the Vicente Pazos Kanki Foundation considering the power structure of the Bolivian State similar to that of a drug cartel. In 2012, the Brazilian magazine Veja accused Evo Morales and his then minister Juan Ramón Quintana, of providing raw material for the production of drugs that were destined for Brazil. That same year senator Roger Pinto asked Brazil for political asylum for fear of an attack on his personal security and for having "evidence of corruption and links with drug trafficking at the highest levels of the government of President Evo Morales". In October 2020, the FELCN (the Bolivian anti-narcotics police force) and the interim government announced seizures of over 12 tons of cocaine and 436 tons of marijuana in the last year. The FELCN also destroyed 806 factories and 26 cocaine laboratories and confiscated 453 vehicles, 111 buildings and 20 light aircraft and cash.

Electoral history

Honors and awards

Honorary degrees
: Universidad Pública de El Alto honorary degree, 20 December 2008.
: National University of La Plata honorary degree, 28 April 2009.
: National University of Comahue honorary degree, 28 April 2010.
: Universidad Privada del Valle honorary degree, 31 July 2010.
: Hansei University honorary degree, 25 August 2010.
: National University of San Juan honorary degree, 1 September 2010.
: Renmin University of China honorary degree, 11 August 2011.
: University of Havana honorary degree, 19 September 2011.
: National University of Salta honorary degree, 18 November 2014.
: Sapienza University of Rome honorary degree, 6 November 2015.
: University of Pau and the Adour Region honorary degree, 7 November 2015.
: National University of Entre Ríos honorary degree, 13 September 2018.
: Universidad de San Carlos de Guatemala honorary degree, 15 November 2018.
: National University of Tierra del Fuego honorary degree, 27 February 2019.
: Peoples' Friendship University of Russia honorary degree, 11 July 2019.
: Universidad Nacional de las Artes honorary degree, 30 October 2020.

See also
 Domestic policy of Evo Morales
 Foreign policy of Evo Morales
 Evo Morales and the Roman Catholic Church

References

Notes

Footnotes

Bibliography

 
 
 
 
 
 
 
 
 
 
 
 
 
 
 *

External links

 Ministry of the Presidency 
 Evo Morales profile at BBC News
 Extended biography and tenure by CIDOB
 

 

Evo Morales
1959 births
Living people
20th-century Bolivian politicians
21st-century Bolivian politicians
Anti-Americanism
Anti-imperialism in South America
Anti-Zionism in South America
Aymara politicians
Bolivian Christian socialists
Bolivian exiles
Bolivian people of Aymara descent
Bolivian politicians of indigenous peoples descent
Brickmakers
Candidates in the 2002 Bolivian presidential election
Candidates in the 2005 Bolivian presidential election
Candidates in the 2009 Bolivian presidential election
Candidates in the 2014 Bolivian presidential election
Candidates in the 2019 Bolivian presidential election
Cocalero activists
Indigenous leaders of the Americas
Left-wing populism in South America
Members of the Bolivian Chamber of Deputies from Cochabamba
Movement for Socialism (Bolivia) politicians
People expelled from public office
People from Sud Carangas Province
Presidents of Bolivia
Presidents pro tempore of the Community of Latin American and Caribbean States
Presidents pro tempore of the Union of South American Nations
Recipients of the Order of the Sun of Peru
Socialism of the 21st century
South American democratic socialists
United Left (Bolivia) politicians